NiT, NIT or Nits may refer to:

Education
 Narula Institute of Technology, West Bengal, India
 National Institutes of Technology, India
 Naval Institute of Technology, Biliran, Philippines
 Nippon Institute of Technology, Japan
 Northern Institute of Technology Management, Germany
 Babol Noshirvani University of Technology, Iran

Science and technology
 Nit, the egg case of a head louse
 Nit (unit), of luminance
 Nat (unit) or nit, natural unit of information
 Network Investigative Technique, computer malware used by the FBI

Other uses
 National Invitation Tournament, for US men's college basketball
 Nagpur Improvement Trust, India
 Nits (band), a Dutch musical group
 National Indigenous Times, indigenous Australian affairs newspaper
 Negative income tax
 Neith or Nit, ancient Egyptian goddess
 Norfolk International Terminals, facility of the Virginia Port Authority, US
 Notice inviting tenders, Indian equivalent of invitation to tender
 NIT, a former state TV channel in Moldova; see Media of Transnistria
 Former State of East Indonesia  (Negera Indonesia Timur)

See also